Ben Kitchen (born 19 August 1986) is a former English footballer who played as a midfielder.

References

1986 births
Living people
English footballers
Association football midfielders
Rochdale A.F.C. players
English Football League players